Dr. Rania Elwani (born 14 October 1977) is an Egyptian Olympic and former African Record holding swimmer. She swam for Egypt at 1992, 1996 and 2000 Olympics.

Education
She attended and swam for the USA's Southern Methodist University from 1997 to 1999. She later obtained a Bachelor of Medicine and Surgery from Misr University for Science and Technology in 2004, and a Master of Obstetrics and Gynaecology from Ain Shams University in 2014. She also had a Sports Management Diploma from the International Centre for Sports Studies, Switzerland in September 2009, and a Healthcare and Hospital Management Diploma from the American University in Cairo in 2015.

Career
In 2004, she became a member of the International Olympic Committee. In 2010, she became a member of the Athlete Committee of the World Anti-Doping Agency (WADA).

She is a member of the 'Champions for Peace' club, a group of more than 90 famous elite created by Peace and Sport, a Monaco-based international organization placed under the High Patronage of H.S.H Prince Albert II. This group of top level champions, wish to make sport a tool for dialogue and social cohesion.

Awards
 Order of Merit of First Class for Sports
 Egypt's Athlete of the year: 1991–1998
Arab Athlete of the Games, Jordan: 1999
The Arab Sports Federations Order of Merit for Sport: 1997
 The Sheikh Mohammed Bin Rashid Award for Sports Excellence: 2014
The International Fairplay Award, Italy: 2010
source:

References

1977 births
Sportspeople from Giza
Egyptian female swimmers
Egyptian obstetricians and gynaecologists
Living people
Olympic swimmers of Egypt
International Olympic Committee members
World Anti-Doping Agency members
Swimmers at the 1992 Summer Olympics
Swimmers at the 1996 Summer Olympics
Swimmers at the 2000 Summer Olympics
African Games gold medalists for Egypt
African Games medalists in swimming
African Games bronze medalists for Egypt
Mediterranean Games gold medalists for Egypt
Swimmers at the 1997 Mediterranean Games
SMU Mustangs women's swimmers
Mediterranean Games medalists in swimming
Competitors at the 1999 All-Africa Games
Southern Methodist University alumni
Ain Shams University alumni
20th-century Egyptian women